The High Hand is a 1926 American silent Western film directed by Leo D. Maloney and starring Maloney, Josephine Hill and Paul Hurst.

Cast
 Leo D. Maloney as Sandy Sands
 Josephine Hill as Edith Oaks
 Paul Hurst as Chris Doble
 Murdock MacQuarrie as Martin Shaler
 Whitehorse as John Oaks
 Gus Saville as Swamper
 Dick La Reno as Sheriff
 Florence Lee as Mrs. Oaks
 Bob Burns as Cowhand

References

External links
 

1926 films
1926 Western (genre) films
American black-and-white films
Films directed by Leo D. Maloney
Pathé Exchange films
Silent American Western (genre) films
1920s English-language films
1920s American films